Hervé Le Roux  (1958 – 26 July 2017) was a French film critic and director.

Early life
Hervé Le Roux was born in 1958.

Career
Le Roux began his career as a critic for Cahiers du Cinéma. In 1989, he was an assistant director to Alain Bergala's Incognito.

Le Roux directed three films. His first film, Grand bonheur, was released in 1993. His second film, released in 1997, was a three-hour documentary called Reprise. The film showed the reactions of factory workers in Saint-Ouen, Seine-Saint-Denis who had to return to work at the end of the 1968 strikes. His third film, On appelle ça... le printemps, was released in 2001.

Death
Le Roux died on 26 July 2017 in Poitiers at the age of 59.

References

1958 births
2017 deaths
People from Poitiers
French film critics
French film directors